The 1971–72 Norwegian 1. Divisjon season was the 33rd season of ice hockey in Norway. Eight teams participated in the league, and Hasle Loren Idrettslag won the championship.

First round

Second round

Final round

Relegation round

External links 
 Norwegian Ice Hockey Federation

Nor
GET-ligaen seasons
1971 in Norwegian sport
1972 in Norwegian sport